Saatkamp is a surname. Notable people with the surname include:

Herman Saatkamp (born 1942), American university president
Lucas Saatkamp (born 1986), Brazilian volleyball player
German toponymic surnames

Low German surnames